Motoichi is a masculine Japanese given name. Notable people with the name include:

, Japanese photographer and illustrator
, Japanese samurai

Japanese masculine given names